Uzliany (Uzlyany), also known as Uzlany, is a town in Belarus near Minsk (Puchavičy District of Minsk Region).

In the past it was a shtetl with a large Jewish population.

Notable residents 

Eugene Lyons - American journalist and writer.
David Sarnoff - The founder of National Broadcasting Company, American businessman and pioneer of American radio and television.

External links
article on the synagogue

 
Populated places in Puchavičy District
Igumensky Uyezd